Club Deportivo Tauste is a Spanish football team based in Tauste in the community of Aragon. Founded in 1945, it plays in Primera Regional.

Colours

 Home colours: yellow and black striped shirt, black shorts and black socks.
 Away colours: red shirt, black shorts and red socks.

Season to season

15 seasons in Tercera División
53 seasons in Categorías Regionales

External links
Official Facebook Page  
Official Twitter Page 

Football clubs in Aragon
Association football clubs established in 1945
1945 establishments in Spain